Rubén Camacho (17 October 1953 – March 2015) was a Mexican cyclist. He competed in the individual road race event at the 1976 Summer Olympics.

References

External links
 

1953 births
2015 deaths
Mexican male cyclists
Olympic cyclists of Mexico
Cyclists at the 1976 Summer Olympics
Sportspeople from Los Mochis
Pan American Games medalists in cycling
Pan American Games bronze medalists for Mexico
Medalists at the 1975 Pan American Games